St John’s RC Academy is a Catholic, 2-18 all-through school located in Perth, Scotland.

History
The academy resulted from a merger of St John’s Primary School and St Columba’s High School. The secondary part of the school opened in March 2010
and the nursery and primary part in November 2011. John Swinney MSP officially opened the academy in December 2011.

The original St John’s School was established in 1864 while St. Columba’s High School officially opened in 1967.

Facilities
The Academy is located at the centre of the North Inch Community Campus. This campus has a range of facilities open to the community including a library, meeting rooms, drama and music facilities and sports facilities. All of these can be accessed by the students.

Sports
The Academy has formed a sports partnership with Perth Grammar School. This partnership was awarded the first inter-denominational Sports Comprehensive status in Scotland under the banner, 'Everyone Active'. It won the Sunday Mail/Sports Scotland Scottish Sports Award 2011. The winning category was 'School Sports Award'. The partnership organises joint sports teams.

Awards
The Academy received the UNICEF UK Rights Respecting School Gold Award in 2014 and 2019.

Notable pupils
 Colin McCredie - actor
Stephen Gethins MP
Dave Doogan MP

References

Secondary schools in Perth and Kinross
Schools in Perth, Scotland
1864 establishments in Scotland
Educational institutions established in 1864
Catholic secondary schools in Perth and Kinross
Primary schools in Perth and Kinross
Catholic primary schools in Scotland
School buildings completed in 2011